The 2017 Charlotte mayoral election took place on Tuesday, November 7, 2017. Party primary elections were held on Tuesday, September 12, 2017. Second-round primaries would have been held on Tuesday, October 10, 2017, if they had been necessary, but both primary winners received more than the minimum 40 percent of the vote needed to avoid a runoff. The incumbent, Democrat Jennifer Roberts, was eligible to run for a second two-year term. She ran but lost the Democratic nomination in the primary. Two members of the City Council, Democrat Vi Lyles and Republican Kenny Smith, won the primaries and advanced to face each other in the general election. Vi Lyles defeated Kenny Smith in the general election, and became the 59th mayor of Charlotte, North Carolina.

Background
Jennifer Roberts, a former Mecklenburg County commissioner, was elected to her first term in 2015 when she defeated Republican Edwin Peacock III, a former Charlotte City Councilman.

Democratic primary

Candidates

Declared
Jennifer Roberts, incumbent
Joel Ford, North Carolina State Senator
Vi Lyles, Charlotte City Councilwoman
Constance Partee-Johnson
Lucille Puckett

Declined
David Howard, former Charlotte City Councilman

Endorsements

Polling

Results

Republican primary

Candidates

Declared
Kimberley Paige Barnette, former magistrate
Barnette garnered controversy in September 2017 when her Facebook page briefly described herself as "Republican $ Smart, White, Traditional." The controversy garnered national attention.
Gary M. Dunn, candidate for Democratic nomination in 2013
Kenny Smith, Charlotte City Councilman

Endorsements

Results

General election

Polling

Results

Notes

References

2017
Charlotte mayoral
Charlotte